A segment of a system variable in computing shows a homogenous status of system dynamics over a time period.  Here, a homogenous status of a variable is a state which can be described by a set of coefficients of a formula. For example, of  homogenous statuses, we can bring status of constant ('ON' of a switch) and linear (60 miles or 96 km per hour for speed). Mathematically, a segment is a function mapping from a set of times which can be defined by a real interval, to the set  [Zeigler76],[ZPK00], [Hwang13]. A trajectory of a system variable is a sequence of segments concatenated. We call a trajectory constant (respectively linear) if its concatenating segments are constant (respectively linear).

An event segment is a special class of the constant segment with a constraint in which the constant segment is either one of a timed event or a null-segment. The event segments are used to define Timed Event Systems such as DEVS, timed automata, and timed petri nets.

Event segments

Time base 

as the set of non-negative real numbers.

Event and null event 
An event is a label that abstracts a change. Given an event set , the null event denoted by  stands for nothing change.

Timed event 
A timed event is a pair  where   and  denotes that an event  occurs at time .

Null segment 

Unit event segment 
A unit event segment is either a null event segment or a timed event.

Concatenation 

Event trajectory 
An event trajectory
 over an event set  and a time interval  is concatenation of unit event segments  and  where
.

Mathematically, an event trajectory is a mapping  a time period  to an event set . So we can write it in a function form :

Timed language 

A timed language  over an event set  and a timed interval

See also 
 Outline of computing

References 
 [Zeigler76] 
 [ZKP00] 
 [Giambiasi01] Giambiasi N., Escude B. Ghosh S. “Generalized Discrete Event Simulation of Dynamic Systems”, in: Issue 4 of SCS Transactions: Recent Advances in DEVS Methodology-part II, Vol. 18, pp. 216–229, dec 2001
 [Hwang13] M.H. Hwang, ``Revisit of system variable trajectories``, Proceedings of the Symposium on Theory of Modeling & Simulation - DEVS Integrative M&S Symposium ,  San Diego, CA, USA, April 7–10, 2013

Automata (computation)
Formal specification languages